Maxim Rasimovich Sharafutdinov (born 15 September 1980) is a Russian journalist, television presenter of Channel One.

Biography 
Maxim Sharafutdinov was born on 15 September 1980 in Kazan, Tatar ASSR, USSR. Played in KVN. Graduated from Kazan State Technical University. Worked in the TV of Tatarstan.

His father, Rasim Sharafutdinov is an ethnic Tatar.

On 25 March 2010 Sharafutdinov presented the inauguration of the president of Tatarstan, Rustam Minnikhanov.

References

1980 births
Tatar people of Russia
Mass media people from Kazan
Living people
Russian journalists